Gottfried Blocklinger (1847-1930) was a Rear-admiral in the United States Navy.

Early life and career
Blocklinger was born in Dubuque, Iowa on October 23, 1847.  He was admitted to the United States Naval Academy in 1863 and graduated in 1868.
Notable achievements include: in 1879 as a Lieutenant, he commanded the survey of the Madeira River, in the Amazon. Was a lieutenant on board the  during the Baltimore crisis of 1891. And was the Executive Officer, on board the  during the Capture of Guam to the United States during the Spanish–American War in 1898.

Service Record

1863-69; During the American Civil War he was a midshipman at the US Naval Academy.
1868-82; Coast survey 
1880 Served aboard the  
1885; hydrographic office 
1883-86;  
1888-89; insp. 7th light-house dist., (the western coast of Florida)
1890;  which was assigned to the South Atlantic Station
1891;  Was transferred to the Yorktown during the Baltimore crisis.
1893; Washington Navy Yard 
1893-95; Executive Officer  
1895-96; Mare Island Naval Shipyard California. 
1897-99; Executive Officer,   
1899-01; Commanding Officer ,
1901; Commanding Officer 
11 May 1901 Assigned to Alert'—11 May 1901, Comdr. Gottfried Blocklinger commanded the vessel and was assigned to the Pacific Station as a training vessel for apprentice sailors. In that capacity the vessel made short cruises along the California coast 
1901, 
1902, cruising the waters off the coasts of China, Japan, and Korea 
1902,  flagship of the Cruiser Squadron, U.S. Asiatic Fleet, she cruised the Philippines and the China coast., 
1903; Navy Yard, Norfolk, Virginia, 
1904; Navy Yard, New York, 
1904-06; Commanding Officer , At that time, the Illinois was assigned to the North Atlantic. She engaged in fleet maneuvers, gunnery and seamanship training, and ceremonial operations.   In 1906, the Illinois was the first US ship to win the famous Prince Louis Battenberg Cup
1906-09; Member Naval Examining and Retiring Boards. No officer below the grade of Captain can be promoted to a higher grade until recommended by the Boards.
1909; Retired to 1192 Locust St., Dubuque, Iowa 

Admiral Blocklinger was a companion of the District of Columbia Commandery of the Military Order of the Loyal Legion of the United States.  He was assigned insignia number 18,220 and was one of the last Civil War veterans to join the Order.

Promotions
Acting Midshipman, 22 July 1863 
Graduated United States Naval Academy, 2 June 1868 
Promoted to Ensign, April 19, 1869 
Promoted to Master, July 12, 1870
Promoted to Lieutenant, April 2, 1874
Promoted to Lieutenant-Commander., May 21, 1895
Promoted to Commander, March 3, 1899
Promoted to Captain., June 1, 1904
Promoted to Rear-admiral, October 30, 1908
Retired, October 23, 1909

Sources and external links
DEPARTMENT OF THE NAVY—NAVAL HISTORICAL CENTER 
Chambers's Encyclopedia. The Records Of Living Officers Of The U. S. Navy And Marine Corps Fourth Edition. 1890 L. R. Hamersly & Co. 1890.  Pg 190-191
Who's Who in America Volume XI, 1920-1921
The Call, a San Francisco newspaper, includes Blocklinger and covers the Capture of Guam 
Report of the Secretary of the Navy, November 30, 1879 

1847 births
1930 deaths
United States Navy rear admirals (lower half)
People from Dubuque, Iowa
Military personnel from Iowa